Bucculatrix bechsteinella is a moth of the family Bucculatricidae. It was described by Johann Matthäus Bechstein and Georg Ludwig Scharfenberg in 1805. It is found in most of Europe, except Greece and Bulgaria.

The wingspan is 7–9 mm. The head is pale fuscous, mixed in middle with blackish. Forewings are brownish-whitish, irrorated with dark fuscous; a more or less distinct dark streak along fold from base to near middle, often
incomplete; three oblique costal spots between 1/3 and apex, and a median dorsal spot suffusedly dark fuscous: second discal stigma forming a short blackish dash. Hindwings are grey. The larva is dull green, more yellowish above; dorsal line darker; dots yellowish and the head pale
brown 
Adults are on wing from mid-May to mid-August. The larvae feed on Amelanchier, Chaenomeles, Cotoneaster, Crataegus douglasii, Crataegus laevigata, Crataegus monogyna, Cydonia oblonga, Malus domestica, Mespilus germanica, Prunus insititia, Prunus spinosa, Pyracantha coccinea, Pyrus communis, Sorbus aria, Sorbus aucuparia and Sorbus torminalis. They mine the leaves of their host plant. The mine has the form of a small, hook-like corridor, mostly in a vein axle. The frass is deposited in a thick central line. The larvae soon leave their mine and resumes feeding living freely on the leaf. Larvae can be found from June to August. They are greenish yellow with a darker head. Pupation takes place in a white, ribbed cocoon on detritus.

Gallery

References

External links

 Images representing Bucculatrix bechsteinella at Consortium for the Barcode of Life

Bucculatricidae
Leaf miners
Moths described in 1805
Moths of Europe
Taxa named by Johann Matthäus Bechstein